Bali United Women Football Club is a women's association football club based in Gianyar, Bali, Indonesia. Founded in 2019, the club is affiliated with men's professional association football club Bali United. It was established in 2019 as part of PSSI's efforts to foster women's football in Indonesia. The team competes in Liga 1 Putri.

History 
In July 2019, Bali United announced their commitment to take part in the inaugural season of Liga 1 Putri, a women's football competition in Indonesia and formed a women's football team. Bali United Women Football Club were officially introduced on 3 October 2019. Sandhika Pratama was appointed as the club's first head coach, with their inaugural 25-player squad announced on the same day.

The nickname Srikandi Tridatu is taken from the name of Srikandi, one of the figures in the Mahabharata epic. Srikandi is the daughter of the king of the Panchala Kingdom, who later became a hero in the Bharatayuddha war. The figure of the Srikandi knight is expected to be played by Bali United Women players while on the field.

The team's first game back was on 6 October 2019, where they draw 1–1 against PSM Putri in the Liga 1 Putri, with Fitriya Hilda scoring their first competitive goal.

Current squad

Club officials

References

External links 
  
 Bali United Women at PSSI

Bali United W.F.C.
Bali United Women
Bali United Women
Bali United Women
Bali United Women